This is a list of the mammal species recorded in Cape Verde. There are thirteen mammal species in Cape Verde, of which one is endangered and two are vulnerable.

The following tags are used to highlight each species' conservation status as assessed by the International Union for Conservation of Nature:

Some species were assessed using an earlier set of criteria. Species assessed using this system have the following instead of near threatened and least concern categories:

Order: Chiroptera (bats) 

The bats' most distinguishing feature is that their forelimbs are developed as wings, making them the only mammals capable of flight. Bat species account for about 20% of all mammals.

Family: Vespertilionidae
Subfamily: Vespertilioninae
Genus: Hypsugo
 Savi's pipistrelle, Hypsugo savii LR/lc
Genus: Pipistrellus
 Kuhl's pipistrelle, Pipistrellus kuhlii LC
Genus: Plecotus
 Grey long-eared bat, Plecotus austriacus LR/lc

Order: Cetacea (whales) 

The order Cetacea includes whales, dolphins and porpoises. They are the mammals most fully adapted to aquatic life with a spindle-shaped nearly hairless body, protected by a thick layer of blubber, and forelimbs and tail modified to provide propulsion underwater.

Suborder: Mysticeti
Family: Balaenopteridae
Subfamily: Balaenopterinae
Genus: Balaenoptera
 Common minke whale, Balaenoptera acutorostrata VU
 Sei whale, Balaenoptera borealis EN
 Bryde's whale, Balaenoptera brydei EN
 Blue whale, Balaenoptera musculus EN
 Fin whale, Balaenoptera physalus EN
Subfamily: Megapterinae
Genus: Megaptera
 Humpback whale, Megaptera novaeangliae VU
Suborder: Odontoceti
Superfamily: Platanistoidea
Family: Phocoenidae
Genus: Phocoena
 Harbour porpoise, Phocoena phocoena VU
Family: Physeteridae
Genus: Physeter
 Sperm whale, Physeter macrocephalus VU
Family: Kogiidae
Genus: Kogia
 Pygmy sperm whale, Kogia breviceps DD
 Dwarf sperm whale, Kogia sima DD
Family: Ziphidae
Genus: Mesoplodon
 Blainville's beaked whale, Mesoplodon densirostris DD
 Gervais' beaked whale, Mesoplodon europaeus DD
Genus: Ziphius
 Cuvier's beaked whale, Ziphius cavirostris DD
Family: Delphinidae (marine dolphins)
Genus: Orcinus
 Killer whale, Orcinus orca DD
Genus: Feresa
 Pygmy killer whale, Feresa attenuata DD
Genus: Pseudorca
 False killer whale, Pseudorca crassidens DD
Genus: Delphinus
 Short-beaked common dolphin, Delphinus delphis LR/cd
Genus: Lagenodelphis
 Fraser's dolphin, Lagenodelphis hosei DD
Genus: Stenella
 Pantropical spotted dolphin, Stenella attenuata LR/cd
 Clymene dolphin, Stenella clymene DD
 Striped dolphin, Stenella coeruleoalba DD
 Atlantic spotted dolphin, Stenella frontalis DD
 Spinner dolphin, Stenella longirostris LR/cd
Genus: Steno
 Rough-toothed dolphin, Steno bredanensis DD
Genus: Tursiops
 Common bottlenose dolphin, Tursiops truncatus LC
Genus: Globicephala
 Short-finned pilot whale, Globicephala macrorhynchus DD
Genus: Grampus
 Risso's dolphin, Grampus griseus DD
Genus: Peponocephala
 Melon-headed whale, Peponocephala electra DD

Order: Carnivora (carnivorans)

There are over 260 species of carnivorans, the majority of which eat meat as their primary dietary item. They have a characteristic skull shape and dentition.
Suborder: Caniformia
Family: Phocidae (earless seals)
Genus: Monachus
 Mediterranean monk seal, M. monachus  possibly extirpated

See also
Wildlife of Cape Verde
List of chordate orders
Lists of mammals by region
List of prehistoric mammals
Mammal classification
List of mammals described in the 2000s

Notes

References

Cape Verde
Cape Verde

Mammals